Paresh Patel (born 18 September 1985) is an Indian cricketer. He made his first-class debut for Odisha in the 2005–06 Ranji Trophy on 23 November 2005.

References

External links
 

1985 births
Living people
Indian cricketers
Odisha cricketers
Sportspeople from Bhubaneswar
Cricketers from Odisha